Moussa Diarra may refer to:

Moussa Diarra (footballer, born 1990), French football centre-back for Barnet
Moussa Diarra (footballer, born 2000), French football defender for Toulouse
Moussa Diarra (footballer, born 2002), Malian football centre-back for Málaga